This is a list of episodes of the Chinese variety show Running Man in season 3. The show airs on ZRTG: Zhejiang Television.

Episodes

References

External links
Running Man China Official Homepage 

2015 Chinese television seasons
2016 Chinese television seasons